Pregnancy-specific beta-1-glycoprotein 9 is a protein that in humans is encoded by the PSG9 gene.

References

Further reading